Franck Laporte is a French former ice dancer. With Stéphanie Guardia, he is the 1995 World Junior silver medalist and 1995 International St. Gervais bronze medalist.

Competitive highlights 
(with Guardia)

References 

French male ice dancers
Living people
World Junior Figure Skating Championships medalists
Year of birth missing (living people)